Denise Lee Richards (born February 17, 1971) is an American actress, television personality, and former fashion model. Her most recognized roles are Carmen Ibanez in Starship Troopers (1997), Kelly Van Ryan in Wild Things (1998) and Bond girl Christmas Jones in The World Is Not Enough (1999). She has also appeared in films Drop Dead Gorgeous (1999), Valentine (2001), Undercover Brother (2002), Scary Movie 3 (2003), Love Actually (2003), and Madea's Witness Protection (2012).

Her television roles include Paramount Network's sitcom Blue Mountain State (2010–2011), ABC Family's mystery-thriller series Twisted (2013–2014) and CBS' soap opera The Bold and the Beautiful (2019–present).
Richards starred on the E! reality show Denise Richards: It's Complicated (2008–2009) and Bravo's reality television series The Real Housewives of Beverly Hills (2019–2020). In 2011, Richards published a memoir, The Real Girl Next Door, which became a New York Times Best Seller.

Early life
Richards was born in Downers Grove, Illinois, to Joni (née Braden), a coffee shop owner, and Irv Richards, a telephone engineer, whose father's surname was Reichert. Her mother died of cancer in November 2007. She is of German and French descent. Richards has a younger sister, Michelle. She grew up in both Downers Grove and Mokena, Illinois. As a child, she was the "only girl on the baseball team".

When Richards was 15 years old, her family moved to Oceanside, California. In 1989, she graduated from El Camino High School. She was voted best looking in her high school yearbook. Richards was raised Catholic. After her high school graduation, she began working as a model and traveled to cities such as Paris, New York, and Tokyo to do photo shoots and commercials.

Career

1990–2008: Career beginnings and breakthrough 
Richards began her career as a teenager in modeling and appeared in print ads for Bonne Bell cosmetics in 1991. She also appeared on the cover of Teen magazine, instructional video "Modeling: What It Takes" and later went on to appear in Max Factor's Premiere 2K advertising campaign.

In the 1990s, Richards appeared in several films and television shows such as Loaded Weapon 1 (1993), Tammy and the T-Rex (1994), Lookin' Italian (1994), and guest starring in episodes of Saved by the Bell, Married... with Children and Doogie Howser, M.D. In 1993, she portrayed Ben Affleck's character's girlfriend named Jodi Collins, in the short-lived drama series Against the Grain. Richards made guest appearances in several television shows, including Beverly Hills, 90210 (1992), Seinfeld (1993), Lois and Clark (1994), and a guest-arc in Melrose Place (1996).
In 1995, Richards appeared in a made-for-TV movie In the blink of an eye, alongside Veronica Hamel and Mimi Rogers.

Her first starring role in a wide theatrical release was Starship Troopers in 1997 for which Richards was nominated for the Blockbuster Entertainment Award for Favorite Female Newcomer. The film grossed a total of $121.2 million worldwide. In 2012, Slant Magazine ranked the film at number 20 on its list of the 100 Best Films of the 1990s. She followed this with a role in the erotic thriller film Wild Things (1998) alongside Kevin Bacon, Matt Dillon and Neve Campbell. Variety praised Richards's transition from good-girl-type roles to manipulative villainess and the review continued to include her as part of "an ensemble that appears to be enjoying the challenge of offbeat roles and unusual material. There's not a wrong note struck by the game group of players." In 2016, Glamour praised the film's female characters by describing Richards and Neve Campbell as "two of the most well-rounded, fascinating, and exciting characters to ever grace the screen."

Richards was cast as the nuclear physicist Christmas Jones in the James Bond film The World Is Not Enough (1999). Though she considered her role "brainy", "athletic", and having depth of character, she was criticized as not credible in the role. Her outfit, which often comprised a low-cut tank top and tight shorts, elicited unfavorable comments. Richards stated that a lot of viewers "made fun of" the character's attire but that "These Bond girls are so outrageous and if I did really look like a scientist, the Bond fans would have been disappointed." Richards was nominated for the Blockbuster Entertainment Award for Favourite Actress – Action, for the film. Later that year, Richards starred alongside Kirsten Dunst in the beauty pageant satire, Drop Dead Gorgeous. The film has gained new fans with time and is regarded as a cult film. Richards, playing a spoiled princess, was praised for her performance by Los Angeles Times for being "as rightly nasty as she is pretty".

In 2001, she guest-starred in Friends as Ross and Monica Geller's cousin, Cassie Geller in the episode "The One with Ross and Monica's Cousin". Later that year she appeared in four episodes of Spin City as Jennifer Duncan, a love interest of Charlie Sheen's character. She starred as Sheen's character's ex-girlfriend two years later in two episodes of Two and a Half Men. Richards appeared in numerous films such as Valentine (2001), Good Advice (2001), Undercover Brother (2002), The Third Wheel (2002) and You Stupid Man (2002). She played Annie Logan in the horror comedy film Scary Movie 3 (2003), which was a commercial success and grossed $220 million worldwide. The film's plot significantly parodies the films The Ring, Signs, The Matrix Reloaded. Richards made a brief appearance in the British romantic comedy Love Actually (2003). In 2004, she appeared in two films, Whore and Elvis Has Left the Building.

In 2005, Richards had a lead role as publicist Jolene in the short-lived UPN soap opera Sex, Love & Secrets. The series focused on rich young adults living in Silver Lake, Los Angeles, and their secrets involving sex and love. She starred in the ensemble drama film Edmond (2005) alongside William H. Macy and Mena Suvari. In 2008, she reunited with her Wild Things on-screen mother Theresa Russell in the drama film Jolene (2008). Her reality show Denise Richards: It's Complicated debuted on E! on May 26, 2008. The series followed the daily lives of Richards, her daughters Sam and Lola, and her married younger sister Michelle and father Irv. Entertainment Weekly published a review and wrote that "It's Complicated is one of those "celebs, they're just like us!" shows in which we're expected to enjoy watching a famous pampered person doing things we don't want to do either." The series concluded after two seasons on July 26, 2009.

2009–2019: Memoir and television roles 

Richards appeared on the 8th season of dance competition television series Dancing with the Stars, paired with Maksim Chmerkovskiy. She was the second contestant eliminated on March 24, 2009. She landed the role of Autumn Bliss in the romantic comedy film Deep in the Valley (2009) alongside Kim Kardashian and Chris Pratt. In 2010, she joined Paramount Network's sitcom Blue Mountain State as Debra Simon. The series is about a fictional university, Blue Mountain State, and its football team, the "Mountain Goats". It portrays certain aspects of American university life, including American football, sex, drinking, and partying. In February 2012, it was reported that Blue Mountain State would not be renewed for a fourth season. Over the years, due in large part to being streamable on Netflix, the series has developed a cult following. In July 2011, Richards published a memoir The Real Girl Next Door, a New York Times Best Seller. Richards decided to write a book because she "wanted to do something inspirational for other people going through challenging times," she told HuffPost in 2011. In September 2011, Richards reportedly turned down $100,000 to appear as an ex-girlfriend at Charlie Sheen's funeral in Two and a Half Men. A month later, she began filming a guest spot for an episode for the sixth season of NBC comedy series 30 Rock. Richards was part of TV Guide Network's show, Hollywood Moms' Club, which aired in November 2011.

Richards played Kate Needleman in the comedy film Madea's Witness Protection (2012), which grossed $67 million at the box office. Madea's Witness Protection was filmed in Atlanta in early 2012 and was released through 34th Street Films and Lionsgate. In 2012, Richards joined the cast of ABC Family's mystery-thriller television series Twisted. In 2015, she appeared in two films, Operation: Neighborhood Watch! and Christmas Trade. In 2016, she made a guest appearance as herself in The CW's Jane the Virgin, in the episode "Chapter Fifty-One." She portrayed Kat Faust in the musical thriller film American Satan (2017), for which Richards was nominated for the Festival Award for Best Supporting Actress in a Feature Film at the Northeast Film Festival. Later that year, Richards portrayed Temple Hampton in an episode of Bravo's comedy-drama series Girlfriends' Guide to Divorce. She starred in the supernatural horror film The Toybox (2018) opposite Mischa Barton. The film is about a family who go on a summer road trip in a used RV and get stranded in the desert by a supernatural force that is slowly killing them off. She portrayed Karen in the faith-based film The Prayer Box (2018), released on October 20, 2018.

In August 2018, Richards announced that she would be joining the Bravo reality series, The Real Housewives of Beverly Hills, for the show's ninth season, which premiered on February 12, 2019. Vanity Fair described her addition to the series by saying: "She might be one of the most famous people to join the Housewives franchise, someone who was a legitimate household name before becoming a reality star. Now, that doesn't always translate to on-screen gold, but it is a nice little coup for Bravo." The New York Times wrote that Richards "brought a refreshing and occasionally disarming dose of reality" to the series. On May 31, 2019, The Daily Beast wrote that "Richards's appearance on the show is the best kind of surprise, one that reveals that a celebrity is not who we may have assumed them to be. She's an extremely warm, loving parent, without a hint of narcissism or vapidity about her." Fox News called her "an instant fan favorite" when she joined the show in 2019.

In 2019, she joined the cast of CBS' soap opera The Bold and the Beautiful as Shauna Fulton. "Shauna is a fun-loving, hard-working single mother from Las Vegas who aspires to live life to its absolute fullest," executive producer and headwriter Bradley Bell told People magazine. In July 2019, it was announced that Richards had joined the cast of Fox Broadcasting's comedy-drama television series BH90210 in a guest role, playing a fictionalized version of herself. She portrayed overly-ambitious mother Candice in Lifetime television film The Secret Lives of Cheerleaders, released on September 2, 2019. "I think the story's about this girl that's trying to fit in and makes some bad choices and then, knowing right from wrong, decided to make a better choice," Richards told Parade. On November 4, 2019, Richards appeared as a guest model on the game show The Price Is Right. Richards played Valerie in the Christmas film My Adventures with Santa (2019) opposite Patrick Muldoon. The film was released in limited theaters on November 15, 2019.

2020–present: Films 
Richards returned for The Real Housewives of Beverly Hills' tenth season, which premiered on April 15, 2020. On September 10, 2020, her representative confirmed that Richards is leaving the series after two seasons. In late 2020, Richards traveled to Spain to begin filming adventure drama series Glow & Darkness, portraying the role of Countess of Champagne. In 2020, she appeared in five films: Money Plane, Switched, Reality Queen!, Alpha Code and Timecrafters: The Treasure of Pirate's Cove. The heist film Money Plane was released to video-on-demand services on July 10, 2020, by Quiver Distribution. In Switched, released on September 4, 2020, Richards portrayed Victoria Sharp, the mother of a school bully. On August 28, 2021, she played Amanda in Lifetime's thriller film Killer Cheer Mom. The film follows a high school junior named Riley, who moved to a new town with her dad and stepmom, Amanda (Richards).

Modeling and other ventures
During her career, Richards has graced the covers of numerous magazines, including Cosmopolitan (Poland, Greece, US and Germany), Redbook, Details, Esquire, Self, Shape, GQ, Bella and Empire. In December 2004, she posed for a nude pictorial in Playboy magazine, five months after giving birth. Richards posed semi-nude for the July 2006 issue of Jane magazine to raise money for the Clothes Off Our Back Foundation. She has appeared in television commercials for Pepsi, Head & Shoulders, Secret, J.C. Penney and Librero. Richards walked the runway at the "Max Factor Salutes Hollywood" fashion show on March 14, 2007, in Hollywood. In 2010, Richards walked the runway for Ali Landry and Annie Kate Pons' fashion line, Belle Parish's fashion show. In September 2019, she walked the runway for Kyle Richards' and Shahida Clayton's new clothing brand at New York Fashion Week.

Richards launched her self-titled fragrance in spring 2012. In 2012, Richards appeared in an infomercial for abdominal muscle toner "The Flex Belt" alongside Adrianne Curry, Lisa Rinna and Janet Evans. In 2013, she became the brand ambassador for Oro Gold Cosmetics. In 2017, she appeared in furniture brand Urban Home's commercials and advertising campaigns. She has appeared in rock band Blues Traveler's music video for the song "Canadian Rose" and rapper Snoop Dogg's music video for "Undercova Funk".

In November 2019, Richards announced that she has developed a skincare line with CBme Beauty.

Richards joined OnlyFans as a content creator in June 2022, as a gesture of support for her daughter Sam, who had attracted criticism for launching her own account. She said that she believed "the creators of [OnlyFans] really took the best of every platform of social media and put it into one site," because as a creator, "you own your content. The other sites, they can sell your content." Her friend, Tori Spelling, later admitted to subscribing with a pseudonymous account and spending over $400 on content and tips in two days.

Public image 
Richards's appearance has often been the subject of media attention. In 1999, she was ranked #9 in Maxim's 50 Sexiest Women. In 2001, she was voted #2 in FHM's 100 Sexiest Women, #5 in FHM'''s 100 Sexiest Women and #19 in AskMen.com's 50 Most Beautiful Women. She was named one of the "100 Hottest Women of All-Time" by Men's Health. In 2002, Richards was ranked at number 21 in Stuff magazine's "102 Sexiest Women in the World." In 2011, Men's Health ranked her at number 61 on their list of "100 Hottest Women of All Time." Shape magazine ranked her at number 7 on their list of "10 of Our Fave Bond Girls: Then and Now."

Personal life
Richards became engaged to actor Charlie Sheen on December 26, 2001, and married him on June 15, 2002, at the estate of Spin City creator Gary David Goldberg. They have two daughters together, Sam J. Sheen (born March 9, 2004) and Lola Rose Sheen (born June 1, 2005). In March 2005, while pregnant with their second daughter, Richards filed for divorce from Sheen. She sought a restraining order against Sheen, alleging death threats against her. On April 19, 2006, Richards filed formal legal papers seeking a divorce from Sheen under the laws of the state of California. The divorce was finalized on November 30, 2006; Sheen was ordered to stay 300 feet away from his ex-wife and their daughters, except during supervised visits. In May 2010, Sheen surrendered legal custody of Sam and Lola to Richards. They previously had joint legal custody of their daughters. According to a source, Richards wanted sole legal custody, given Sheen's "marital turmoil, sobriety issues, and criminal problems" and he did not put up a fight about it. Under their divorce agreement, she has primary physical custody and he has visitation rights.

By mid-2012, Richards and Sheen were on good terms, often spending time together with their children. In 2012, Sheen made a cameo appearance in her movie Madea's Witness Protection, while Richards appeared in Sheen's television series Anger Management. In a move supported by Sheen, in May 2013, Richards was awarded temporary custody of the twin sons born in 2009 to Sheen and his wife Brooke Mueller, after the children were removed from Mueller's home by child protective services due to concerns over drug use.

In June 2011, Richards adopted a third daughter, Eloise Joni Richards, as a single parent. Her middle name honors Richards’ deceased mother. Richards adopted her at birth, following a two-year adoption process. Eloise has a rare chromosomal disorder, Chromosome 8, Monosomy 8p, which affects her speech. Richards has worked on learning sign language to communicate with her daughter.

In December 2017, Richards began dating Aaron Phypers. On September 8, 2018, Richards and Phypers were wed in Malibu, California. In May 2019, Richards announced that Phypers is adopting her youngest daughter, Eloise.

Philanthropy

Outside of work, Richards dedicates much of her time to philanthropy. She has supported numerous charities, including Dave Thomas Foundation for Adoption, Elizabeth Glaser Pediatric AIDS Foundation, Feeding America, Much Love Animal Rescue, Barbara Davis Center for Childhood Diabetes, Best Friends Animal Society and Children's Hospital Los Angeles. Richards has also appeared in the NOH8 Campaign and has spoken in support of gay marriage.

Richards has worked with Best Friends Animal Society on several projects, including its Pup My Ride program, which transports small dogs from high-kill animal shelters to other parts of the US where there is a greater demand for small dogs. She promoted Best Friends Animal Society's Save Them All campaign in 2014. "I've been involved with Best Friends Animal Society since 2009 and I've seen firsthand the differences they've made and the countless lives they've saved," Richards said. She has regularly appeared on Access Hollywood's monthly pet segment showcasing shelter dogs rescued by Best Friends and available for adoption."Denise Richards Has a New, Blind Best Friend" . Fox News. May 16, 2011. Accessed January 1, 2013. While assisting with relief efforts in New York following Hurricane Sandy, she worked together with North Shore Animal League, and adopted a puppy from a Long Island shelter.

She has walked the runway for charity fashion shows, such as Susan G. Komen's 8th Annual Fashion For The Cure, Clothes Off Your Back Benefit and The Heart Truth's Red Dress Fall 2011 Collections. In January 2012, she launched her first collaboration with fashion subscription service ShoeDazzle to design the "Eloise" heel and raised over $15,000 for the Kidney Cancer Association. In December 2012, she designed two shoes for ShoeDazzle as part of their Celebrity Shoe Design Program for Charity. Profits from the shoe sales went to the Kidney Cancer Association. After Richards lost her mother to kidney cancer, she dedicated her time to raising awareness and helping the Kidney Cancer Association. In November 2015, Richards and her daughters spent Thanksgiving volunteering and serving food for homeless families.

In June 2018, she joined The Will Rogers Motion Picture Pioneers Foundation's summer theatrical PSA campaign to benefit Brave Beginnings, which funds vital neonatal equipment to U.S. hospitals. Richards filmed a public service announcement that was played at movie theaters nationwide.

Filmography

Film
{| class="wikitable sortable"
|-
! Year
! Title
! class="unsortable" style="width:12em;" |Role
! class="unsortable" style="width:8em;" | Notes
|-
| 1993
| Loaded Weapon 1| Cindy
|
|-
| rowspan="2" | 1994
| Lookin' Italian| Elizabeth
|
|-
| Tammy and the T-Rex| Tammy
|
|-
| rowspan="2" | 1997
| Nowhere| Jana
|
|-
| Starship Troopers| Carmen Ibañez
| 
|-
| 1998
| Wild Things| Kelly Lanier Van Ryan
| 
|-
| rowspan="3" | 1999
| Drop Dead Gorgeous| Rebecca "Becky" Ann Leeman
|
|-
| The World Is Not Enough| Dr. Christmas Jones
| 
|-
| Tail Lights Fade| Wendy
|
|-
| rowspan="2" | 2001
| Valentine| Paige Prescott
|
|-
| Good Advice| Cindy Styne
|
|-
| rowspan="4" | 2002
| Empire| Trish
|
|-
| Undercover Brother| Penelope Snow/White She-Devil
|
|-
| | Diana Evans
|
|-
| You Stupid Man| Chloe
|
|-
| rowspan="2" | 2003
| Love Actually| Carla
| 
|-
| Scary Movie 3| Annie Logan
| Cameo
|-
| rowspan="2" | 2004
| Whore| Rebecca Smith
|
|-
| Elvis Has Left the Building| Belinda
|
|-
| 2005
| Edmond| B-girl
|
|-
| rowspan="2" | 2008
| Blonde and Blonder| Dawn St. Dom
|
|-
| Jolene| Marin Leger
|
|-
| rowspan="3" | 2009
| Finding Bliss| Bliss/Laura
|
|-
| Kambakkht Ishq| Denise Richards
|
|-
| Deep in the Valley| Autumn Bliss
|
|-
| 2011
| Cougars, Inc.| Judy
|
|-
| rowspan="2" | 2012
| Madea's Witness Protection| Kate Needleman 
|
|-
| Freeloaders| Denise Richards
|
|-
| rowspan="2" | 2015
| Operation: Neighborhood Watch!| Denise Sorensen 
|
|-
| Christmas Trade| Chloe 
| 
|-
| 2016
| A Life Lived 
| Elizabeth
|
|-
| rowspan="5" |2017
| Altitude 
| FBI Agent Gretchen Blair 
| 
|-
|American Violence| Dr. Amanda Tyler
|
|-
| American Satan| Kat Faust
|
|-
|A Violent Man 
|Victoria
|
|-
|Saturday at the Starlight|Mrs. Sproat
|
|-
| rowspan="4" | 2018
| The Toybox| Jennifer
|
|-
| Destined to Ride| Aunt Glo
|
|-
| The Prayer Box| Karen
| 
|-
|1st Born 
|Christine
|
|-
| rowspan="2" |2019
|Adventures of Dally & Spanky|Kelly Banks
|
|-
|My Adventures With Santa|Valerie Nolan
|
|-
| rowspan="5" |2020
|Reality Queen!|Angelina Streisand
|
|-
| Alpha Code 
| Johana 
|
|-
| Money Plane
| Sarah Peters
|
|-
| Switched 
|Victoria Sharp
| 
|-
|Timecrafters: The Treasure of Pirate's Cove
|Victoria Dare
|
|-
|2021
|Send It!
| Catherine
|
|-
|rowspan="3"|2022
|Love Accidentally
|Debra
|
|-
|Junkyard Dogs
|Monica Sullivan
|
|-
|Wickensburg
|Celine Lucas
|
|-
|rowspan="2"|2023
|Angels Fallen: Warriors of Peace
|Deborah
|In production
|-
|A Walking Miracle
|Pamela
|In production
|}

Television

Music videos

Awards and nominations

Published works 
 Richards, Denise. The Real Girl Next Door. Gallery Books, 2011.

References

External links

 
 
 

1971 births
Living people
20th-century American actresses
21st-century American actresses
Actresses from Illinois
American female models
American film actresses
American soap opera actresses
American television actresses
American people of French descent
American people of German descent
Female models from Illinois
People from Downers Grove, Illinois
The Real Housewives cast members
People from Mokena, Illinois
People from Oceanside, California